Lagunón is a barrio (neighbourhood) at the northwest end of the city of Rivera in the Rivera Department of northeastern Uruguay.

Geography
This barrio is located along the street Presidente Girón, which joins the city with the park "Parque Gran Bretaña". It is only  from the border with Brazil.

Population
In 2011 Lagunón had a population of 2,376.
 
Source: Instituto Nacional de Estadística de Uruguay

References

External links
INE map of Rivera, Santa Teresa, Mandubí and Lagunón

Populated places in the Rivera Department